Aliabad (also Romanized as ‘Alīābād; also known as Al’var and Ālvār) is a village in Khanandabil-e Sharqi Rural District, in the Central District of Khalkhal County, Ardabil Province, Iran. At the 2006 census, its population was 1,330, in 266 families.

References 

Tageo

Towns and villages in Khalkhal County